Joseph Carey Merrick (5 August 1862 – 11 April 1890), often erroneously called John Merrick, was an English man known for having severe deformities. He was first exhibited at a freak show under the stage name "the Elephant Man" and then went to live at the London Hospital after he met Sir Frederick Treves, subsequently becoming well known in London society.

Merrick was born in Leicester and began to develop abnormally before the age of five. His mother died when he was eleven and his father soon remarried. Rejected by his father and stepmother, he left home and went to live with his uncle Charles Merrick. In 1879, 17-year-old Merrick entered the Leicester Union Workhouse. In 1884, he contacted a showman named Sam Torr and proposed that Torr should exhibit him. Torr arranged for a group of men to manage Merrick, whom they named "the Elephant Man". After touring the East Midlands, Merrick travelled to London to be exhibited in a penny gaff shop rented by showman Tom Norman. Norman's shop was visited by surgeon Frederick Treves, who invited Merrick to be examined. After Merrick was displayed by Treves at a meeting of the Pathological Society of London in 1884, Norman's shop was closed by the police; Merrick joined Sam Roper's circus and was toured in Europe.

In Belgium, Merrick was robbed by his road manager and abandoned in Brussels. He eventually made his way back to the London Hospital, where he was allowed to stay for the rest of his life. Treves visited him daily, and the pair developed a close friendship. Merrick also received visits from the wealthy ladies and gentlemen of London society, including Alexandra, Princess of Wales. Although the official cause of his death was asphyxia, Treves, who performed the postmortem, said Merrick had died of a dislocated neck.

The exact cause of Merrick's deformities is unclear. In 1986, it was conjectured that he had Proteus syndrome. DNA tests on his hair and bones in a 2003 study were inconclusive, because his skeleton had been bleached multiple times before being displayed at the Royal London Hospital. Merrick's life was depicted in a 1979 play by Bernard Pomerance, and a 1980 film by David Lynch, both titled The Elephant Man.

Early life and family 

Joseph Carey Merrick was born on 5 August 1862 at 50 Lee Street in Leicester, to Joseph Rockley Merrick and his wife Mary Jane (née Potterton). Joseph Rockley Merrick (–1897) was the son of London-born weaver Barnabas Merrick (1791–1856) who moved to Leicester during the 1820s or 1830s, and his third wife Sarah Rockley. Mary Jane Potterton (–1873) had been born at Evington, Leicestershire, her father being William Potterton, who was described as an agricultural labourer in the 1851 census of Thurmaston, Leicestershire. She was said to have some form of physical disability, and as a young woman worked as a domestic servant in Leicester before marrying Joseph Rockley Merrick, then a warehouseman, in 1861.

The following year, Joseph Carey Merrick was born, apparently healthy. He had no outward anatomical signs or symptoms of any disorder for the first few years of his life. Named after his father, he was given the middle name Carey by his mother, a Baptist, after the preacher William Carey. The Merricks had two more children, not three as stated on his mother's grave. John Thomas Merrick, born 21 April 1864, who died of smallpox on 24 July of the same year, was not related to Joseph and Mary Jane Merrick.

The other two children were: William Arthur, born January 1866, who died of scarlet fever on 21 December 1870 aged four and was buried on Christmas Day 1870; and Marion Eliza, born 28 September 1867, who was born with physical disabilities and died of myelitis and "seizures" on 19 March 1891, aged 23. William is buried with his mother, aunts and uncles in Welford Road Cemetery in Leicester while Marion is buried with her father in Belgrave Cemetery in Leicester. In his book The Elephant Man: A Study in Human Dignity, Ashley Montagu states that " Merrick was born on 21 April 1864". Montagu believed Treves's statement in his book, The Elephant Man and Other Reminiscences, referring to Merrick's first name as John, not Joseph, was due to confusing him with his supposed younger brother, who was later discovered to be of no relation to Joseph Merrick.

A pamphlet titled "The Autobiography of Joseph Carey Merrick", produced c. 1884 to accompany his exhibition, states that he started to display anatomical signs at approximately five years of age, with "thick lumpy skin ... like that of an elephant, and almost the same color". According to a 1930 article in the Illustrated Leicester Chronicle, he began to develop swellings on his lips at the age of 21 months, followed by a bony lump on his forehead and a loosening and roughening of the skin. As he grew, a noticeable difference between the size of his left and right arms appeared and both his feet became significantly enlarged. The Merrick family explained his symptoms as the result of Mary's being knocked over and frightened by a fairground elephant while she was pregnant with Joseph. The concept of maternal impression—that the emotional experiences of pregnant women could have lasting physical effect on their unborn children—was still common in 19th-century Britain. Merrick held this belief about the cause of his disability for his entire life.

In addition to his deformities, at some point during his childhood, Merrick fell and damaged his left hip. This injury became infected and left him permanently disabled. Although affected by his physical deformities, Merrick attended school and enjoyed a close relationship with his mother. She was a Sunday school teacher, and his father worked as an engine driver at a cotton factory, as well as running a haberdashery business. On 29 May 1873, fewer than three years after the death of her youngest son William, Mary Jane Merrick died from bronchopneumonia. Joseph Rockley Merrick moved with his two children to live with Mrs. Emma Wood Antill, a widow with children of her own. They married on 3 December 1874.

Employment and the workhouse 

Merrick left school aged 13, which was usual for the time. His home-life was now "a perfect misery", and neither his father nor his stepmother demonstrated affection towards him. He ran away "two or three" times, but was taken back by his father each time. At 13 he found work rolling cigars in a factory, but after three years, the deformity of his right hand had worsened and he no longer had the dexterity required for the job. Now unemployed, he spent his days wandering the streets, looking for work and avoiding his stepmother's taunts.

Merrick was becoming a greater financial burden on his family, and eventually his father secured him a hawker's licence which enabled him to earn money selling items from the haberdashery shop, door to door. This endeavour was unsuccessful, for Merrick's facial deformities rendered his speech increasingly unintelligible, and prospective customers reacted with horror to his physical appearance. People refused to open doors for him and now people not only stared at him but followed him out of curiosity. Merrick failed to make enough money as a hawker to support himself. On returning home one day in 1877, he was severely beaten by his father and he left home for good.

Merrick was now homeless on the streets of Leicester. His uncle, a barber named Charles Merrick, heard of his nephew's situation, sought him out and offered him accommodation in his home. Merrick continued to hawk around Leicester for the next two years but his efforts to earn a living met with little more success than before. Eventually, his disfigurement drew such negative attention from members of the public that the Commissioners for Hackney Carriages withdrew his licence when it came up for renewal. With young children to provide for, Charles could no longer afford to support his nephew. In late December 1879, now 17 years old, Merrick entered the Leicester Union Workhouse.

Merrick became one of 1,180 residents in the workhouse. Joseph was given a classification to determine his place of accommodation. The class system determined which department or ward he would reside in as well as the amounts of food he would receive. Joseph was classified as Class One for able-bodied males and females. On 22 March 1880, only 12 weeks after entering, Merrick signed himself out of the workhouse and spent two days looking for work. With no more success than before, he found himself with no option but to return to the workhouse. This time he stayed for four years.

Around 1882, Merrick underwent surgery on his face. The protrusion from his mouth had grown to 20–22 centimeters and severely inhibited his speech and made it difficult to eat. He was operated on in the Workhouse Infirmary under the direction of Dr Clement Frederick Bryan and had a large part of the mass removed.

Life as a curiosity 
Merrick concluded that his only escape from the workhouse might be through the world of human novelty exhibitions. He knew of a Leicester music hall comedian and proprietor named Sam Torr. Merrick wrote to Torr, who came and visited him at the workhouse. Torr decided he could make money exhibiting Merrick; although, to retain Merrick's novelty, he would have to be a travelling exhibit. To this end, he organised a group of managers for Merrick: music hall proprietor J. Ellis, travelling showman George Hitchcock, and fair owner Sam Roper. On 3 August 1884, Merrick departed the workhouse to start his new career.

The showmen named Merrick the Elephant Man, and advertised him as "Half-a-Man and Half-an-Elephant". They showed him around the East Midlands, including in Leicester and Nottingham, before moving him on to London for the winter season. George Hitchcock contacted an acquaintance, showman Tom Norman, who ran penny gaff shops in the East End of London exhibiting human curiosities. Without a meeting, Norman agreed to take over Merrick's management and in November, Hitchcock travelled with Merrick to London.

When Tom Norman first saw Merrick, he was dismayed by the extent of his deformities, fearing his appearance might be too horrific to be a successful novelty. Nevertheless, he exhibited Merrick in the back of an empty shop on Whitechapel Road. Merrick had an iron bed with a curtain drawn around to afford him some privacy. Norman observed Merrick asleep one morning and learnt that he always slept sitting up, with his legs drawn up and his head resting on his knees. His enlarged head was too heavy to allow him to sleep lying down and, as Merrick put it, he would risk "waking with a broken neck". Norman decorated the shop with posters that had been created by Hitchcock, depicting a monstrous half-man, half-elephant. A pamphlet titled "The Autobiography of Joseph Carey Merrick" was created, outlining Merrick's life to date. This biography, whether written by Merrick or not, provided a generally accurate account of his life. It contained an incorrect date of birth but, throughout his life, Merrick was vague about when he was born.

Norman gathered an audience by standing outside the shop and drawing a crowd through his showman's patter. He would then lead his onlookers into the shop, explaining that the Elephant Man was "not here to frighten you but to enlighten you". Drawing aside the curtain, he allowed the onlookers—often visibly horrified—to observe Merrick up close, while describing the circumstances leading to his present condition, including his mother's alleged accident with an elephant.

The Elephant Man exhibit was moderately successful, and made money primarily from the sales of the autobiographical pamphlet. Merrick was able to put his share of the profits aside, hoping to earn enough to one day buy a home of his own. The shop on Whitechapel Road was directly across the road from the London Hospital, an excellent location, as medical students and doctors visited the shop, curious to see Merrick. One visitor was a young house surgeon named Reginald Tuckett. Like his colleagues, Tuckett was intrigued by the Elephant Man's deformities and told his senior colleague Frederick Treves.

Frederick Treves first met Merrick that November at a private viewing, before Norman opened the shop for the day. Treves later recalled in his 1923 Reminiscences that Merrick was "the most disgusting specimen of humanity that I had ever seen ... at no time had I met with such a degraded or perverted version of a human being as this lone figure displayed." The viewing lasted no more than 15 minutes after which Treves returned to work. Later that day, he sent Tuckett back to the shop to ask if Merrick might be willing to come to the hospital for an examination. Norman and Merrick agreed. To enable him to travel the short distance without drawing undue attention, Merrick wore a costume consisting of an oversized black cloak and a brown cap with a hessian sack covering his face, and rode in a cab hired by Treves.

At the hospital, Treves examined Merrick, observing that he was "shy, confused, not a little frightened, and evidently much cowed". At this point, Treves assumed the Elephant Man was an "imbecile". He noted that his skin was covered in papillomata (warty growths), the largest of which exuded an unpleasant smell. The subcutaneous tissue appeared to be weakened and caused a loosening of the skin, which in some areas hung away from the body. There were bone deformities in the right arm, both legs, and, most conspicuously, in the large skull. Despite the corrective surgery to his mouth in 1882, Merrick's speech remained barely intelligible. His left arm and hand were not large and were not deformed. His penis and scrotum were normal. Apart from his deformities and the lameness in his hip, Treves concluded that Merrick appeared to be in good general health.

Norman later recalled that Merrick went to the hospital for examination "two or three" times and during one of their meetings, Treves gave Merrick his calling card. On one of the visits, Treves had photographs taken, and he provided Merrick with a set of copies which were later added to his autobiographical pamphlet. On 2 December, Treves presented Merrick at a meeting of the Pathological Society of London in Bloomsbury. Eventually, Merrick told Norman that he no longer wanted to be examined at the hospital. According to Norman, he said he was "stripped naked and felt like an animal in a cattle market".

During this time in Victorian Britain, tastes were changing in regard to freak show exhibitions like the Elephant Man. Shows like Norman's were a cause for public concern, both on the grounds of decency and due to the disruption caused by crowds gathering outside them. Not long after Merrick's last examination with Frederick Treves, the police closed down Norman's shop on Whitechapel Road, and Merrick's Leicester managers withdrew him from Norman's care. In 1885, Merrick went on the road with Sam Roper's travelling fair. He befriended two other performers, "Roper's Midgets"—Bertram Dooley and Harry Bramley—who on occasion defended Merrick from public harassment.

Europe 
The dampening of public enthusiasm for freak shows and human oddities continued, and the police and magistrates became increasingly vigilant in closing down shows. Merrick remained a horrifying spectacle for his viewers and Roper grew nervous about the negative attention the Elephant Man drew from local authorities. Merrick's group of managers decided he should go on tour in continental Europe, with the hope that authorities there would be more lenient. Merrick's management was assumed by an unknown man (possibly named Ferrari) and they left for the continent. 

The Elephant Man was no more successful there than in Britain, and similar action was taken by authorities to move him out of their jurisdictions. In Brussels, Merrick was deserted by this new manager, who stole Merrick's £50 (2018 equivalent £) savings. Abandoned, Merrick made his way by train to Ostend, where he attempted to board a ferry for Dover, but was refused passage. He travelled to Antwerp, and was able to board a ship bound for Harwich in Essex. From there, he travelled by train to London and arrived at Liverpool Street station.

Merrick arrived at Liverpool Street Station on 24 June 1886, safely back in his own country, but with nowhere to go. He was not eligible to enter a workhouse in London for more than one night and would be accepted only by Leicester Union, where he became a permanent resident.

He approached strangers for help, but his speech was unintelligible and his appearance repugnant. He drew a crowd of curious onlookers until a policeman helped him into an empty waiting room, where he huddled in a corner, exhausted. Unable to make himself understood, his only identifying possession was Frederick Treves' card. 

The police contacted Treves, who went to the station. Recognising Merrick, Treves took him in a hansom cab to the London Hospital. Merrick was admitted for bronchitis, washed, fed and then put to bed in a small isolation room in the hospital's attic.

London Hospital 

With Merrick admitted into the hospital, Treves now had time to conduct a more thorough examination. He discovered that Merrick's physical condition had deteriorated over the previous two years and that he had become quite impaired by his deformities. Treves also suspected that Merrick now had a heart condition and had only a few years left to live. Merrick's general health improved over the next five months under the care of the hospital staff. Although some nurses were initially upset by his appearance, they overcame this and cared for him.

The problem of his unpleasant odour was mitigated through frequent bathing and Treves gradually developed an understanding of Merrick's speech. A new set of photographs was taken. The question of Merrick's long-term care had to be addressed. Francis Carr Gomm, the chairman of the hospital committee, had supported Treves in his decision to admit Merrick, but by November, long-term plans needed to be made. The London Hospital was not equipped or staffed to provide care for the incurable, which Merrick clearly was.

Carr Gomm contacted other institutions and hospitals more suited to caring for chronic cases, but none would accept Merrick. Gomm wrote a letter to The Times, printed on 4 December, outlining Merrick's case and asking readers for suggestions. The public response—in letters and donations—was significant, and the situation was even covered by the British Medical Journal. With the financial backing of the many donors, Gomm was able to make a convincing case to the committee for keeping Merrick in the hospital. It was decided that he would be allowed to stay there for the remainder of his life. He was moved from the attic to two rooms in the basement adjacent to a small courtyard. The rooms were adapted and furnished to suit Merrick, with a specially constructed bed and—at Treves's instruction—no mirrors.

Merrick settled into his new life at the London Hospital. Treves visited him daily and spent a couple of hours with him every Sunday. Now that Merrick had found someone who understood his speech, he was delighted to carry on long conversations with the doctor. Treves and Merrick built a friendly relationship, although Merrick never completely confided in him. He told Treves that he was an only child, and Treves had the impression that his mother, whose picture Merrick always carried with him, had abandoned him as a baby. Merrick was also reluctant to talk about his exhibition days, although he expressed gratitude towards his former managers. It did not take Treves long to realise that, contrary to his initial impressions, Merrick was not intellectually impaired.

Treves observed that Merrick was very sensitive and showed his emotions easily. At times, Merrick was bored and lonely, and demonstrated signs of depression. He had spent his entire adult life segregated from women, first in the workhouse and then as an exhibit. The women he met were either disgusted or frightened by his appearance. His opinions about women were derived from his memories of his mother and what he read in books. Treves decided that Merrick would like to be introduced to a woman and it would help him feel normal. The doctor arranged for a friend of his named Mrs. Leila Maturin, "a young and pretty widow", to visit Merrick. She agreed and with fair warning about his appearance, she went to his rooms for an introduction. The meeting was short, as Merrick quickly became overcome with emotion. He later told Treves that Maturin had been the first woman ever to smile at him, and the first to shake his hand. She kept in contact with him and a letter written by Merrick to her, thanking her for the gift of a book and a brace of grouse, is the only surviving letter written by Merrick. This first experience of meeting a woman, though brief, instilled in Merrick a new sense of self-confidence. He met other women during his life at the hospital, and appeared taken with them all. Treves believed that Merrick's hope was to go to live at an institution for the blind, where he might meet a woman who could not see his deformities.

Merrick wanted to know about the "real world", and questioned Treves on a number of topics. One day he expressed a desire to see inside what he considered a "real" house and Treves obliged, taking him to visit his Wimpole Street townhouse and meet his wife. At the hospital, Merrick filled his days with reading and constructing models of buildings out of card. He entertained visits from Treves and his house surgeons. He rose each day in the afternoon and would leave his rooms to walk in the small adjacent courtyard, after dark.

As a result of Carr Gomm's letters to The Times, Merrick's case attracted the notice of London's high society. One person who took a keen interest was actress Madge Kendal. Although she probably never met him in person, she was responsible for raising funds and public sympathy for Merrick. She sent him photographs of herself and employed a basket weaver to go to his rooms and teach him the craft. Other people of high society did visit him, however, bringing gifts of photographs and books. He reciprocated with letters and handmade gifts of card models and baskets. Merrick enjoyed these visits and became confident enough to converse with people who passed his windows. A young man, Charles Taylor, the son of the engineer responsible for modifying Merrick's rooms, spent time with him, sometimes playing the violin. Occasionally, he grew bold enough to leave his small living quarters and would explore the hospital. When he was discovered, he was always hurried back to his quarters by the nurses, who feared he might frighten the patients.

On 21 May 1887, two new buildings were completed at the hospital and the Prince and Princess of Wales came to open them officially. Princess Alexandra wished to meet the Elephant Man, so after a tour of the hospital, the royal party went to his rooms for an introduction. The princess shook Merrick's hand and sat with him, an experience that left him overjoyed. She gave him a signed photograph of herself, which became a prized possession, and she sent him a Christmas card each year.

On at least one occasion, Merrick was able to fulfill a long-held desire to visit the theatre. Treves, with the help of Madge Kendal, arranged for him to attend the Christmas pantomime at the Theatre Royal, Drury Lane. Treves sat with some nurses, concealed in Lady Burdett-Coutts' private box. According to Treves, Merrick was "awed" and "enthralled". "The spectacle left him speechless, so that if he were spoken to he took no heed." For weeks following the show, Merrick talked about the pantomime, reliving the story as if it had been real.

Last years 
On three occasions Merrick left the hospital and London on holiday, spending a few weeks at a time in the countryside. Through elaborate arrangements that allowed Merrick to board a train unseen and have an entire carriage to himself, he travelled to Northamptonshire to stay at Fawsley Hall, the estate of Lady Knightley. He stayed at the gamekeeper's cottage and spent the days walking in the estate's woods, collecting wild flowers. He befriended a young farm labourer who later recalled Merrick as an interesting and well-educated man. Treves called this "the one supreme holiday of [Merrick's] life", although in fact there were three such trips.

Merrick's condition gradually deteriorated during his four years at the London Hospital. He required a great deal of care from the nursing staff and spent much of his time in bed, or sitting in his quarters, with diminishing energy. His facial deformities continued to grow and his head became even more enlarged. He died on 11 April 1890, at the age of 27. At around 3:00 p.m. Treves's house surgeon visited Merrick and found him lying dead across his bed. His body was formally identified by his uncle, Charles Merrick. An inquest was held on 27 April by Wynne Edwin Baxter, who had come to notoriety conducting inquests for the Whitechapel murders of 1888.

Merrick's death was ruled accidental and the certified cause of death was asphyxia, caused by the weight of his head as he lay down. Treves, who performed an autopsy, said Merrick had died of a dislocated neck, which likely severed his vertebral arteries. Knowing that Merrick had always slept sitting upright out of necessity, Treves concluded that Merrick must have "made the experiment", attempting to sleep lying down "like other people".

Joseph did not receive a burial, with almost all sections of his body, both skeleton and soft tissue, being preserved for study. Treves dissected Merrick's body and took plaster casts of his head and limbs. He took skin samples, which were later lost during the Second World War, and mounted his skeleton, which remains in the pathology collection at the Royal London Hospital, which amalgamated in 1995 with St Bartholomew's Hospital Medical College, under the aegis of Queen Mary University of London, a constituent college of the federal University of London and a member of the United Hospitals. His mounted skeleton at the medical school is not on public display.

There is a small museum dedicated to his life, housing some of his personal effects, and a new replica of his skeleton went on display in 2012. His remains, in a glass case in a private room at the university, can be viewed by medical students and professionals by appointment, to "allow medical students to view and understand the physical deformities resulting from Joseph Merrick's condition". Although Queen Mary University of London intends to keep his skeleton at its medical school, some are contending that as a devout Christian, Merrick should be given a Christian burial in his home city of Leicester.

On 5 May 2019, author Jo Vigor-Mungovin discovered that Merrick's soft tissue was buried in the City of London Cemetery.

Medical condition 

Ever since Joseph Merrick's days as a novelty exhibit on Whitechapel Road, his condition has been a source of curiosity for medical professionals. His appearance at the meeting of the Pathological Society of London in 1884 drew interest from the doctors present, but neither the answers nor the attention that Treves had hoped for. The case received only a brief mention in the British Medical Journal, and the Lancet declined to mention it at all. Four months later, in 1885, Treves brought the case before the meeting for a second time. By then, Tom Norman's shop on Whitechapel Road had been closed, and Merrick had moved on. Without Merrick, Treves made do with the photographs he had taken during his examinations.

One of the doctors present at the meeting was Henry Radcliffe Crocker, a dermatologist who was an authority on skin diseases. After hearing Treves's description of Merrick, and viewing the photographs, Crocker proposed that Merrick's condition might be a combination of pachydermatocele and an unnamed bone deformity, all caused by changes in the nervous system. Crocker wrote about Merrick's case in his 1888 book Diseases of the Skin: their Description, Pathology, Diagnosis and Treatment.

In 1909, dermatologist Frederick Parkes Weber wrote an article in the British Journal of Dermatology, erroneously citing Merrick as an example of von Recklinghausen Disease (neurofibromatosis), which German pathologist Friedrich Daniel von Recklinghausen had described in 1882. Recently it has been found that this conjecture was wrong: in fact, symptoms that are always present in this genetic disorder include tumours of the nervous tissue and bones, small warty growths on the skin, and the presence of light brown pigmentation on the skin called café au lait spots, which are of particular importance in diagnosing von Recklinghausen Disease; these spots were never observed on Merrick's body. For this reason, although this diagnosis was quite popular through most of the 20th century, other conjectural diagnoses were advanced, such as Maffucci syndrome and polyostotic fibrous dysplasia (Albright's disease).

In a 1986 article in the British Medical Journal, Michael Cohen and J. A. R. Tibbles put forward the hypothesis that Merrick had had Proteus syndrome, a very rare congenital disorder recently identified by Cohen in 1979 (this explains why this diagnosis was not advanced previously), citing Merrick's lack of reported café au lait spots and the absence of any histological proof that he had had the previously conjectured syndrome. In fact, Proteus syndrome affects tissue other than nerves, and it is a sporadic disorder rather than a genetically transmitted disease. Cohen and Tibbles said Merrick showed the following signs of Proteus syndrome: "macrocephaly; hyperostosis of the large skull; hypertrophy of long bones; and thickened skin and subcutaneous tissues, particularly of the hands and feet, including plantar hyperplasia, lipomas, and other unspecified subcutaneous masses".

In a letter to Biologist in June 2001, British teacher and Chartered Biologist Paul Spiring speculated that Merrick might have had a combination of Proteus syndrome and neurofibromatosis. This hypothesis was reported by Robert Matthews, a correspondent for The Sunday Telegraph. The possibility that Merrick had both conditions formed the basis for a 2003 documentary film entitled The Curse of The Elephant Man, which was produced for the Discovery Health Channel by Natural History New Zealand.

During 2002, genealogical research for the film led to a BBC appeal to trace Merrick's maternal family line. In response to the appeal, a Leicester resident named Pat Selby was discovered to be the granddaughter of Merrick's uncle George Potterton. A research team took DNA samples from Selby in an unsuccessful attempt to diagnose Merrick's condition. During 2003, the filmmakers commissioned further diagnostic tests using DNA from Merrick's hair and bone. However, the results of these tests proved inconclusive; therefore, the precise cause of Merrick's medical condition remains uncertain.

Legacy 

In 1923, Frederick Treves published a volume, The Elephant Man and Other Reminiscences, in which he detailed what he knew of Merrick's life and their personal interactions. This account is the source of much of what is known about Merrick, but there were several inaccuracies in the book. Merrick never completely confided in Treves about his early life, so these details were consequently sketchy in Treves's Reminiscences. A more mysterious error is that of Merrick's first name. Treves, in his earlier journal articles as well as his book, insisted on calling him John Merrick. The reason for this is unclear; Merrick clearly signed his name as "Joseph" in the examples of his handwriting that remain. In the handwritten manuscript for The Elephant Man and Other Reminiscences, Treves began his account by writing "Joseph" and then crossed it out and replaced it with "John". Whatever the reason for the error, it is one that persisted throughout much of the 20th century; later biographers who based their work on Treves's book have continued the error.

Treves's depiction of Tom Norman, the showman who had exhibited Merrick, was that of a cruel drunk who had ruthlessly exploited his charge. In a letter to the World's Fair newspaper, and later in his own memoirs, Norman denied this characterisation and said he provided his show attractions with a way of earning a living, and that at the London Hospital Merrick was still on display, but with no control over how or when he was viewed. According to Nadja Durbach, author of The Spectacle of Deformity: Freak Shows and Modern British Culture, Norman's view gives an insight into the Victorian freak show's function as a means of survival for poor people with deformities, as well as the attitude of medical professionals of the time. Durbach cautions that both Treves's and Norman's memoirs must be understood as "narrative reconstructions ... that reflect personal and professional prejudices and cater to the demands and expectations of their very different audiences".

In 1971, anthropologist Ashley Montagu published The Elephant Man: A Study in Human Dignity which drew on Treves's book and explored Merrick's character. Montagu reprinted Treves's account alongside various others such as Carr Gomm's letter to The Times and the report on Merrick's inquest. He pointed out inconsistencies between the accounts and sometimes disputed Treves's version of events; he noted, for example, that while Treves claimed Merrick knew nothing of his mother's appearance, Carr Gomm refers to Merrick carrying a painting of his mother with him, and he criticised Treves's assumption that Merrick's mother was "worthless and inhuman". However, Montagu also perpetuated some of the errors in Treves's work, including his use of the name "John" rather than "Joseph".

In 1980, Michael Howell and Peter Ford published The True History of the Elephant Man, presenting the fruits of their detailed archival research. Howell and Ford brought to light a large amount of new information about Merrick. In addition to proving that his name was Joseph, not John, they were able to describe in more detail his life story. They refuted some of the inaccuracies in Treves's account, showing that Merrick's mother had not abandoned him, and that Merrick deliberately chose to exhibit himself to make a living.

Some persons remarked on Merrick's strong Christian faith (Treves is also said to have been a Christian), and his strong character and courage in the face of disabilities earned him admiration. Between 1979 and 1982, Merrick's life story became the basis of several works of dramatic art; these were based on the accounts of Treves and Montagu. In 1979, The Elephant Man, a Tony Award–winning play by American playwright Bernard Pomerance, was staged. The character based on Merrick was initially played by David Schofield and in subsequent productions by actors including Philip Anglim, David Bowie, Bruce Davison, Mark Hamill and Bradley Cooper. In 1980, a film The Elephant Man, directed by David Lynch, was released; it received eight Academy Award nominations. Merrick was played by John Hurt and Frederick Treves by Anthony Hopkins. In 1982, US television network ABC broadcast an adaptation of Pomerance's play, starring Anglim.

Merrick is portrayed by actor Joseph Drake in two episodes of the second series of BBC historical crime drama Ripper Street, first broadcast in 2013. In 2017, the Malthouse Theatre, Melbourne, commissioned playwright Tom Wright to write a play about Merrick's life. The Real and Imagined History of the Elephant Man premiered on 4 August, and starred Daniel Monks in the title role. The cast also featured Paula Arundell, Julie Forsyth, Emma J. Hawkins, and Sophie Ross.

In August 2018 it was announced that Charlie Heaton would be playing Merrick in a new two part BBC drama, a decision which has drawn criticism from some quarters. In the 2019 sitcom Year of the Rabbit, Merrick was played by David Dawson as a pretentious theatrical type.

In 1995, Canadian alternative rock band Matthew Good Band included a track titled "Haven't Slept in Years" on their debut album, Last of the Ghetto Astronauts, written about Merrick. The band incorrectly referred to Merrick's first name as "John" instead of "Joseph" in a concert at Coquitlam, British Columbia, Canada in 1998.

In 2002, American heavy metal band Mastodon included an instrumental track, "Elephant Man", on their album Remission. In 2004, on their album Leviathan, they included a similar instrumental, "Joseph Merrick", as well as "Pendulous Skin", on 2006's Blood Mountain. On their 2005 album Doppelgänger, American band The Fall Of Troy released a song titled "Whacko Jacko Steals the Elephant Man's Bones", the title referencing reports that Michael Jackson had attempted to buy the skeleton from London Hospital. In 2003, American guitarist Buckethead included the track "John Merrick – Elephant Man Bones Explosion" on his album Bucketheadland 2. In 2006, he released the album The Elephant Man's Alarm Clock, which included a song with the same title. Merrick's life is the subject of Joseph Merrick, The Elephant Man, an opera by composer Laurent Petitgirard, set to a French libretto by Eric Nonn. It premiered on 7 February 2002 at the State Opera House, Prague, and starred contralto Jana Sykorova in the title role.

In November 2016, Joanne Vigor-Mungovin published a book called Joseph: The Life, Times and Places of the Elephant Man, which included a foreword written by a member of Joseph Merrick's family. The book looks into the early life of Merrick and his family in Vigor-Mungovin's hometown of Leicester, with detailed information about Joseph's family and his ambition to be self-sufficient rather than survive on the charity of others.

In 2022, rapper Roc Marciano and producer The Alchemist released their collaborative album titled The Elephant Man's Bones.

References 
Notes

Footnotes

Bibliography

"The Autobiography of Joseph Carey Merrick" – freak shop pamphlet printed c. 1884 to accompany the exhibition of the Elephant Man; printed in The True History of the Elephant Man, pp. 173–175

Further reading 

 Vigor-Mungovin, Joanne (2016), Joseph: The Life, Times and Places of the Elephant Man, London: Mango Books,

External links 

Transcripts of the letters written to The Times newspaper by Francis Carr-Gomm, regarding Joseph Merrick.
Contemporary visual art reference in the work of Australian art Cameron Hayes.

People from Leicester
English people with disabilities
English Christians
Sideshow performers
Accidental deaths in London
1862 births
1890 deaths